A constitutional referendum was held in the Comoros on 7 June 1992. The proposed amendments to the constitution were approved by 76% of voters, with voter turnout at around 64%.

Results

References

Comoros
Referendums in the Comoros
Constitutional
Constitutional referendums in the Comoros
Election and referendum articles with incomplete results